Estádio Joaquim Calmon is a sports stadium in Linhares, Espírito Santo, Brazil.  

It is the home of Linhares Futebol Clube.

References

Football venues in Espírito Santo